Entrechaux is a commune in the Vaucluse department in the Provence-Alpes-Côte d'Azur region in southeastern France.

Sights and monuments
 Château d'Entrechaux, 10th-11th-century castle ruins, open to visitors in summer.

See also
Communes of the Vaucluse department

References

Communes of Vaucluse